A turtle is a reptile, most of whose body is shielded by a special bony or cartilaginous shell. 

Turtle(s) may also refer to:

Entertainment
 Turtle (gaming), a primarily defensive strategy in various computer games
 Turtles (video game), a 1981 arcade game by Konami
 Turtle (magazine), a 1979–2014 American bi-monthly for preschoolers
 Turtle: The Incredible Journey, a 2009 German-British-Austrian documentary
 Teenage Mutant Ninja Turtles, a superhero franchise, sometimes known as Ninja Turtles or Turtles

Fictional characters
 Touché Turtle and Dum Dum, characters in a Hanna-Barbera cartoon show 
 Turtle (comics), two villains who were primarily enemies of Flash
 Turtle (Entourage), a character in the HBO television series Entourage
 The Great and Powerful Turtle, aka "Turtle" or "The Turtle", a character in the Wild Cards novels
 Turtle, a character in Barbara Kingsolver's novels The Bean Trees and Pigs in Heaven

Music
 The Turtles, an American folk-rock band, best known for the 1967 hit song "Happy Together"
 Turtles (South Korean band), a K-Hip-Hop band
 "Turtle", a song from the album twicetagram by South Korean girl group TWICE

Places
 Turtle Mountain (Alberta), Canada
 Turtle Bay (disambiguation)
 Turtle Creek (disambiguation)
 Turtle Island (disambiguation)
 Turtle Lake (disambiguation)

United States
 Turtle, Missouri, a ghost town
 Turtle, Wisconsin, a town
 Turtle Mountains (California)
 Turtle Mound, a prehistoric archaeological site in Florida
 Turtle Pond, Central Park, Manhattan, New York
 Rio Turtle or Turtle Rock, West Virginia

Computing
 Turtle (syntax), a Terse RDF Triple language
 Turtle F2F, a tool for exchanging contents in an anonymous and secure way over a friend-to-friend (F2F) network
 Turtle graphics, using a relative cursor, the "turtle"
 Turtles, small values near the end of the list in sorting; See Comb sort

Watercraft
 Turtle (submersible), the first military diving bell, built during the American Revolutionary War
 DSV Turtle, a retired ocean research submersible of the US Navy

People
 John Turtle (born 1937), Australian academic and endocrinologist
 Roger Turtle (fl. 1326-1344), English politician 
 Tommy Turtle (1950–2020), a British Army officer from Ireland 
 Turtle Bunbury (born 1972), Irish historian and author
 NASA Astronaut Group 22, a group of 12 astronauts nicknamed "The Turtles"

Other uses
 Turtles (chocolate), a type of candy trademarked by DeMet's Candy Company
 Turtle's Records & Tapes, a defunct American retail chain
 Turtle Entertainment, a German company
 Botts' dots, often called turtles in Washington and Oregon
 Turtle (grappling), a grappling position
 European turtle dove, archaic name turtle
 Turtle (robot), a class of educational robots used most prominently in the 1970s and 1980s
 Turtle, a member of the Ancient Order of Turtles, or Turtle Club
 Turtle, a type of spinning float, a breakdancing move
 Turtle beans

See also
 TIRTL, a traffic logger and speed measurement device
 Turtling (disambiguation)
 Chelys, an ancient Greek lyre meaning "Turtle" or "Tortoise"